Echemella is a genus of African ground spiders that was first described by Embrik Strand in 1906.

Species
 it contains six species, mostly from Ethiopia:
Echemella occulta (Benoit, 1965) – Congo
Echemella pavesii (Simon, 1909) – Ethiopia
Echemella quinquedentata Strand, 1906 (type) – Ethiopia
Echemella sinuosa Murphy & Russell-Smith, 2007 – Ethiopia
Echemella strandi (Caporiacco, 1940) – Ethiopia
Echemella tenuis Murphy & Russell-Smith, 2007 – Ethiopia

References

Araneomorphae genera
Gnaphosidae
Spiders of Africa
Taxa named by Embrik Strand